Amusement park accidents refer to serious injuries or deaths that occur at amusement parks. Many such accidents are reported to regulatory authorities as usually required by law everywhere. The US Consumer Product Safety Commission tracks statistics for all amusement ride accidents. Regulations and records can vary depending on the country. Accidents listed here are caused by one of the following:

 Negligence on the part of the guest. This can be refusal to follow specific ride safety instructions, or deliberate intent to violate park rules.
 The result of a guest's known, or unknown, health issues.
 Negligence on the part of the park, either by ride operator or maintenance safety instructions, or deliberate intent to violate park rules.

Statistics for the United States 
 From 1987 to 2000, there were an estimated 4.5 amusement ride-related deaths per year.
 From 1990 to 2004, there were 52 deaths associated with amusement park rides (3.7 per year).

 Every day from May through September in each year between 1990–2010 had an average of 20 injuries by amusement park guests under 18 years of age that required hospitalization.
 In 2011, 1,204 people were injured at 400 amusement parks, according to the IAAPA.
 In 2019, there were 1,299 injuries from amusement park accidents in the U.S.

Notable incidents 
 Incidents at Cedar Fair parks
 Incidents at Disney parks
 Incidents at Herschend parks
 Incidents at LEGOLAND parks
 Incidents at Premier Parks Properties
 Incidents at SeaWorld parks
 Incidents at Six Flags parks
 Incidents at Universal parks
 Incidents at Warner Bros. parks
 Incidents at independent amusement parks
 Incidents at European amusement parks

References

Bibliography 
ASTM F2291, Practice for Design of Amusement Rides and Devices

External links 
 International Association of Amusement Parks and Attractions
 Amusement Safety Organization Amusement ride injuries
 US Consumer Product Safety Commission
 Searchable database of Central Florida amusement park accidents From the Orlando Sentinel, covers the quarterly government reports made by Walt Disney World, Universal Orlando, SeaWorld Orlando, Wet 'n Wild and Busch Gardens Tampa Bay.
 Amusement park accident information
 Ride accident news archive from 1998 onward

 
Lists of amusement park incidents